The Commercial & Financial Chronicle was a business newspaper in the United States founded by William Buck Dana (1829–1910) in 1865.  Published weekly, the Commercial & Financial Chronicle was deliberately modeled to be an American take on the popular business newspaper The Economist, which had been founded in England in 1843.  It was the first national business weekly in the United States.

The Commercial & Financial Chronicle continued the legacy begun by Hunt's Merchant's Magazine and Commercial Review, a monthly business magazine, which was founded in 1839 by Freeman Hunt but disappeared during the American Civil War.  They are together in many library collections.  Dana continued as editor of the Chronicle until his death in 1910.

The Commercial & Financial Chronicle never had the large subscriber base or influence of The Wall Street Journal or Barron's.  In 1872 its circulation was around 4,000 and reached 26,000 by 1922. Data from the publication is, however, used by many economic historians, as it is one of the few sources available. Douglas Steeples, Dana's biographer, wrote that "one can scarcely reconstruct the business history of the United States between the Civil War and 1910 without immersing oneself in his paper.  Even the most important series of business statistics published by the U.S. government, Historical Statistics of the United States [...], depends heavily on his work and that of the correspondents worldwide who contributed to the Chronicle."

In 1895, the William B. Dana Company sued rival Boston-based financial publisher Frank P. Bennett & Co., charging that the new financial supplement printed by Bennett's United States Investor consisted largely of The Chronicle's copyrighted content. "The Chronicle's injunction was granted [by the U.S. Circuit Court for the District of Massachusetts], protecting the copyright. The case is considered an important one because it has been deemed almost impossible heretofore to protect publications like those of The Chronicle," wrote the Library of Congress' Copyright Office in 1980.

The publication (little known or noticed at the time of its demise) ceased publication during the fall out of Black Monday and the stock market troubles of 1987.

References

Further reading 

Commercial and Financial Chronicle issues from 1865-1963, available on FRASER
The Bank and Quotation Record, a companion publication to the Commercial and Financial Chronicle, issues from 1928-1963 available on FRASER
Hunt's Merchants' Magazine and Commercial Review, 1839-1870, available on FRASER
Publication history and listing of supplements to the Commercial and Financial Chronicle, 1875-1928

External links
 
 Archive of issues that are in the public domain: 

Business newspapers published in the United States
Defunct newspapers published in New York City
Weekly newspapers published in the United States
Publications established in 1865
Publications disestablished in 1987